The 2007 IIHF World Championship was held between 27 April and 13 May 2007 in Moscow, Russia. It was the 71st annual world championship event run by the International Ice Hockey Federation (IIHF). The tournament was won by Canada with Rick Nash being named the Most Valuable Player (MVP) of the tournament.

Participating teams

Group A
  (roster)
  (roster)
  (roster)
  (roster)

Group B
  (roster)
  (roster)
  (roster)
  (roster)

Group C
  (roster)
  (roster)
  (roster)
  (roster)

Group D
  (roster)
  (roster)
  (roster)
  (roster)

Venues

Rules
At the 2007 IIHF World Championships, a three-point system for each game is used. Teams winning in regulation were awarded three points, the loser none. Where there was a tie score in the Preliminary, Playoff and Relegation Rounds, teams were given one point each. A five-minute overtime followed and, if the score was still tied after overtime, Game Winning Shots was used. The team winning in overtime or shoot-out was awarded the extra point for a total of two points.

Preliminary round

Group A

All times local (GMT+4)

Group B

All times local (GMT+4)

Group C

All times local (GMT+4)

Group D

All times local (GMT+4)

Qualifying round

Group E

Results from Preliminary Round games among the qualified teams carry over.

All times local (GMT+4)

Group F

Results from Preliminary Round games among the qualified teams carry over.

All times local (GMT+4)

Relegation round
The top two teams in the standings after the round-robin were invited back to the 2008 IIHF World Championship, while the bottom two teams were relegated to the 2008 IIHF Division I Tournament.

Group G

All times local (GMT+4)

Play off

Draw

Quarterfinals
All times local (GMT+4)

Semifinals
All times local (GMT+4)

Bronze-medal game
All times local (GMT+4)

Gold-medal game
All times local (GMT+4)

Ranking and statistics

Champions

Tournament Awards
 Best players selected by the directorate:
 Best Goaltender:  Kari Lehtonen
 Best Defenceman:  Andrei Markov
 Best Forward:  Alexei Morozov
 Most Valuable Player:  Rick Nash
 Media All-Star Team:
 Goaltender:  Kari Lehtonen
 Defence:  Andrei Markov,  Petteri Nummelin
 Forward:  Evgeni Malkin,  Alexei Morozov,  Rick Nash

Final standings
The final standings of the tournament according to IIHF:

Scoring leaders
GP = Games played; G = Goals; A = Assists; Pts = Points; +/- = Plus/minus; PIM = Penalties in minutes; POS = Position

Leading goaltenders
MINS = Minutes (on ice); SA = Shots against; GA = Goals against; GAA = Goals against average; Sv% = Save percentage; SO = Shutouts

IIHF Broadcasting rights

 Austria:
 Austrian Matches: ORF
 Other Matches: ORF Sport Plus
 Canada:
 English: TSN
 French: RDS
 Czech Republic: Česká televize (ČT2, ČT4 Sport)
 Denmark: TV2 Sport
 Finland: YLE
 France: Sport+
 Germany:
 German Matches: ARD, ZDF
 Other Matches: DSF
 Latvia: TV3, TV6 Latvia, 3+ Latvia
 Norway:
 Norwegian Matches: NRK
 Other Matches: Viasat SportN, Viasat Sport 3
 Russia: RTR Sport
 Slovakia: STV
 Slovenia: RTV Slovenija
 Sweden: Viasat
 Switzerland:
 German: SF zwei
 French: TSR 2
 Italian: TSI 2
 Ukraine: Megasport

See also
 2007 in ice hockey

References

External links
 2007 IIHF World Championship official site

 
IIHF World Championship
1
World
International ice hockey competitions hosted by Russia
2007 in ice hockey
Sports competitions in Moscow
Ice hockey in Moscow Oblast
April 2007 sports events in Europe
May 2007 sports events in Europe
2007 in Moscow